Symbiosis Institute of Business Management, Bengaluru (SIBM) is an Indian business school situated in Electronic City, Bangalore, Karnataka. It is a constituent of the Symbiosis International University.

History

The institute was established in 2008 as a constituent of Symbiosis International University a Deemed University located in India. It is the second campus of Symbiosis Institute of Business Management (SIBM).

Events

The college is also home to a number of annual events and recently hosted the South Regional round of Deloitte Maverick.

The annual events hosted by the college include:
 Utopia
The annual International Cultural fest organized by the International Relations Committee is an event to promote the welfare of the international students studying in India.
 Utthaan
Organized by the Social Responsibility Committee the event showcases the talent of underprivileged kids living in NGOs in the city of Bengaluru.
 Alchemy
Organized by the Conferences & Events Committee Alchemy is a management conclave that provides a quality platform for eminent speakers to share industry insights with students.
 TEDx SIBM Bengaluru
The independently organized TED event tries to spark profound discussions and inspire minds to usher in a world of possibilities.
 LifeDart 5K Run
Organized for the first time in the year 2015 the event conducted by the Rotaract Club was able to raise Rs. 1,95,000 through the event.
 Revelation
Organized by the Extracurricular Committee, Revelation, is the flagship event of the college. The fest includes management, cultural and sports events.

The students of the college also organized a tree maintenance drive (Symbriksha) in collaboration with Say Tress organization with an intent of planting saplings around the city of Bengaluru.

Other events organized by the college include Symbrikha and Cycle Day

References

External links
 Official Website

Business schools in Bangalore
Educational institutions established in 2008
2008 establishments in Karnataka